Croatia Zmijavci is a football club from Zmijavci, Split-Dalmatia County, Croatia, currently playing in the second division Druga HNL after their 2019 promotion.

Zmijavci are one of several Dalmatian football teams with a development agreement with Hajduk Split, the largest football club in the area, having signed on in 2016.

History
Zmijavci were founded in 1974, and were known as NK Kujundžuša until 1991.

In the 2017–18 season, Croatia Zmijavci placed in the round of 16 of the Croatian Cup. Zmijavci then won the 2017–18 Treća HNL south division, but refused promotion to the second division. They received a license for the 2019–20 Druga HNL and were promoted after finishing second in the 2018–19 Treća HNL.

Players

Current squad

Honours
Treća HNL South: 2017–18

Notable managers
Mislav Karoglan (2016)
Vik Lalić (2020–present)
Krešimir Režić

References

Football clubs in Croatia
Football clubs in Split-Dalmatia County
Association football clubs established in 1974